Waterbeck is a small village in Annandale, Dumfries and Galloway. It is located on Beck Water in the parish of Middlebie. 

Waterbeck contains a former United Presbyterian church and a primary school. Most buildings in the village are cottages from the 19th century. Waterbeck has a village hall. Originally a school, it was built around 1900. 

Waterbeck is the birthplace of Sir John Carruthers Beattie.

References 

Villages in Dumfries and Galloway